Agononida analoga is a species of squat lobster in the family Munididae. The species name is derived from the Greek analogos, meaning "resembling", which is in reference to its similarity to both Agononida squamosa and Agononida similis.

References

Squat lobsters
Crustaceans described in 1993